Saal is an Indo-Persian word meaning year, and mubarak is an originally Arabic term meaning blessing or good wishes. The greeting Saal Mubarak is therefore used to mark the New Year.

The greeting Saal Mubarak is used by the Parsi community in India and Pakistan to mark Nauroz which occurs in either March or August depending on the specific Zoroastrian calendar used.

Both, Saal Mubarak, and Nutan Varshabhinandan are greetings used by Gujaratis to commemorate the Hindu, Parsi and Jain New Year,  also known as Bestu Varas (beginning of the year). It is celebrated on Balipratipada, which falls on the first day after Diwali: the Hindu, Jain, Sikh and Buddhist festival of lights, which symbolizes the triumph of good over evil and nirvana of Lord Mahavira. The Gujarati New Year starts on Kartak Sud Ekam (The first month and first day of the Gujarati lunisolar calendar. 

The Gujarati community all over the world celebrates the New Year to mark the beginning of a new fiscal year and people put their worries behind them and prepare to welcome a new beginning. Hindus continue with the festivities from Diwali and decorate their homes with rangoli patterns and garlands, light diyas and set off fireworks. It is tradition for Parsi and Gujarati people to wear new clothes on New Years Day and to show respect to their elders to seek their blessings. Revellers visit family and friends to exchange gifts of money and homemade sweets, and wish health and prosperity for the new year. People also visit mandirs to offer puja to the gods.

The Jain calendar Vira Nirvana Samvat has marked this day as New Year since 527 BCE. This day falls on the next day after the day when 24th tirthankar Mahavira attained nirvana (Diwali). The date of 16 November 2020 of the Gregorian calendar was celebrated by Jains as the 2547th New Year's Day. During the times of Hemchandracharya, the entire Gujarati community began celebrating this day as New Year. Jains spend the day by wishing relatives well, visiting temples, reading scriptures, meditating and rescuing animals from slaughter houses.

References

Indian culture
Gujarati language
Diwali
Greeting words and phrases
Parsi culture